Polemocrates, son of Machaon and grandson of Asclepius, was an ancient Greek physician. He had a sanctuary, at the village of Eua in Argolis and was honoured there as a god or hero of the healing art.

References

Pausanias  II 38. § 6.

Ancient Greek physicians
Ancient Argolis
Asclepius